The 1888 United States presidential election in New Jersey took place on November 6, 1888, as part of the 1888 United States presidential election. Voters chose nine representatives, or electors to the Electoral College, who voted for president and vice president.

New Jersey voted for the Democratic nominee, incumbent President Grover Cleveland, over the Republican nominee, Benjamin Harrison. Cleveland won his birth state by a very narrow margin of 2.35%.

A Republican would not win the White House without New Jersey again until 112 years later in 2000, when Al Gore won New Jersey by a landslide but narrowly lost the national election.

Results

Results by county

References

New Jersey
1888
1888 New Jersey elections